Ruvalcaba is a Spanish surname that may refer to
Felipe Ruvalcaba (born 1941), Mexican association football forward 
Higinio Ruvalcaba (1905-1976), Mexican violinist and composer
Lenia Ruvalcaba (born 1986), Mexican judoka 
Marcelo Garza Ruvalcaba (born 1983), Mexican politician
Nicolás Ruvalcaba (born 1982), Mexican association football player 
Rogelio Ruvalcaba (born 1988), Mexican boxer

See also
Bannayan–Riley–Ruvalcaba syndrome, a rare overgrowth syndrome 

Spanish-language surnames